Salix moupinensis, the Moupin willow, is a species of flowering plant in the family Salicaceae, native to western Sichuan and northern Yunnan, China. It resembles Salix fargesii and is available from commercial suppliers.

References

moupinensis
Endemic flora of China
Flora of South-Central China
Plants described in 1887